Asa Owen Aldis (September 2, 1811 – June 24, 1891) was a Vermont attorney, judge and diplomat.  He served as a justice of the Vermont Supreme Court, and as U.S. Consul to Nice, France.

Biography
Asa O. Aldis was born in St. Albans, Vermont on September 2, 1811, the son of Asa Aldis, who served as a justice of the Vermont Supreme Court.  His mother was Amey (Owen) Aldis, whose father Daniel J. Owen had served as Lieutenant Governor of Rhode Island and Chief Justice of the Rhode Island Supreme Court.  His sister Miranda was the wife of Vermont Supreme Court Justice Daniel Kellogg.  He was descended from John Aldis and Nathan Aldis.

Aldis graduated from the University of Vermont in 1829.  He studied at Harvard Law School and Yale Law School, attained admission to the bar in 1832, and practiced in partnership with his father.  Aldis continued to practice in St. Albans after his father's death, first as the partner of John Smith, and later in partnership with Smith's son J. Gregory Smith.  A Republican, In 1857 he was elected a justice of the Vermont Supreme Court, and he continued to serve until resigning in 1865.

The deaths of two daughters, one in 1862, and one in 1863, caused Aldis to solicit a diplomatic appointment that would enable him to move his children to a healthier climate, and he left the Vermont Supreme Court in order to accept appointment as U.S. Consul in Nice.  While en route to Nice to take up his new duties, a third daughter died in London.

Aldis served as Consul in Nice until 1871, when he returned to the U.S. to accept appointment as a member of the Southern Claims Commission, which reviewed and made recommendations for reimbursement on claims for property seized and damaged by the Union during the American Civil War.  In 1880, he was appointed to the French and American Claims Commission, which resolved claims made by French citizens for property that was seized or destroyed by the belligerent parties during the American Civil War.  He served in this position until retiring in 1884.

Death and burial
In retirement, Aldis was a resident of Washington, DC.  He died there on June 24, 1891, and was buried at Greenwood Cemetery in St. Albans, Vermont.

Family
In 1836, Aldis married Elizabeth Sterne Lynde (1815-1837).  They were the parents of a daughter, Elizabeth, who was born and died in 1836.

After his first wife's death, in 1841 Aldis married Mary Townsend Taylor (1824-1909), with whom he had six daughters and two sons:

 Mary Aldis (1844–1863)
 Miranda Metcalf Aldis (1846–1862)
 Harriet "Hattie" Aldis (1848–1865)
 Helen Lynde Aldis (1849–1935), the wife of Chicago real estate developer Bryan Lathrop, in 1875.
 Cornelia Aldis (1854–1921)
 Owen Franklin Aldis (1852–1925), a Chicago attorney and real estate developer who served on the board of directors for the 1893 World's Columbian Exposition.
 Arthur Taylor Aldis (1861–1933), a Chicago real estate developer.
 Amy Owen Aldis (1865–1918), the wife of Richards Merry Bradley Jr. (1861-1943), a prominent real estate investor.

References

Sources

Books

Newspapers

1811 births
1891 deaths
People from St. Albans, Vermont
University of Vermont alumni
Vermont lawyers
Vermont Republicans
Justices of the Vermont Supreme Court
American consuls
Burials in Vermont
Harvard Law School alumni
Yale Law School alumni
19th-century American judges
19th-century American lawyers